L'École secondaire publique Omer-Deslauriers is a French public school in the west of Ottawa, Ontario, Canada. The school's enrolment is approximately 600 students. The school building formerly housed J.S. Woodsworth Secondary School, which was part of the Ottawa School Board / Ottawa-Carleton District School Board, until it closed in 2003.

The school was initially known as École Champlain, then from 1999 to 2002 it was called École de l'Ouest, and was finally renamed to honour Omer Deslauriers (died 1999), an Ontarian educator and public serviceman who promoted establishment of several Francophone schools in Ottawa in the 1960s.

The school is part of the International Baccalaureate's World Schools; it offers both the Middle Years Program (grades 7 to 10) and Diploma Program (grades 11 and 12). Students require a minimum of 80% in order to join and/or to stay in either program.  The high school also offers a construction specialization and a communications programme. 
Other than that, this school offers two Specialist High Skills Major, one for construction and one for information and communication technologies. 

In 2005–2006, the school's basketball team was the first francophone high school to win a bronze medal at the OFSAA AA Provincial Tournament. They also won the school spirit award. The school has many athletic programs, and like many Francophone schools has an improvisational comedy team.

References

External links
École secondaire publique Omer-Deslauriers

High schools in Ottawa
French-language schools in Ottawa
French-language high schools in Ontario
International Baccalaureate schools in Ontario
Educational institutions established in 2001
2001 establishments in Ontario